The Church of Santiago el Mayor (Spanish: Iglesia de Santiago el Mayor) is a church located in Guadalajara, Spain. It was declared Bien de Interés Cultural in 1946.

References 

Bien de Interés Cultural landmarks in the Province of Guadalajara
Buildings and structures in Guadalajara, Spain
Roman Catholic churches in Guadalajara, Spain
Tourist attractions in Guadalajara (Spain)